This is a list of Liberal Unionist Party MPs.  It includes all Members of Parliament elected to the British House of Commons representing the Liberal Unionist Party.

List of MPs

References

Liberal Unionist